Morthomiers is a commune in the Cher department in the Centre-Val de Loire region of France.

Geography
The commune lies on the pilgrimage route known as Saint James's Way.

Population

See also
Communes of the Cher department

References

Communes of Cher (department)